Lyricist Lounge, Volume One is the second hip hop compilation album by American record label Rawkus Records. The double-disc was released on May 5, 1998 as the first installment of Lyricist Lounge album series, based on New York's Lyricist Lounge showcases.

Recording sessions took place at Temple of Soul, at Firehouse Studios, at Animation Sound, at Ozone Studios, at Soundtrack Studios, at Poke's Crib, at Animal Tracks Studios, at D's House, at Platinum Island Studios, at Unique Studios, at Mark Dann Recording Studios, at Rawkus Studios and at Circus Studios in New York City, at The Chop Shop in New Jersey, at the Red October Chemical Storage Facility in Los Angeles with additional recording at Westlake Audio.

Production was handled by Shawn J Period, 88-Keys, Kenny Diaz, Will Tell, Charlemagne, Curt Cowdy, Cut Chemist, Derrick Trotman, DJ Nu-Mark, DJ Scratch, El-P, Ge-Ology, G.M., Hi-Tek, Keith Horne, Megahertz, Native Sun, Nottz, Saul Williams, Stix Bones and V.I.C., with Danny Castro, Ant Marshall and Perry Landsberg serving as executive producers.

It features contributions from Bahamadia, Black Thought, Common, Company Flow, De La Soul, Jurassic 5, Kool Keith, KRS-One, Mos Def, Natural Elements, O.C., Pharoahe Monch, Punchline, Q-Tip, Rah Digga, Ras Kass, Saul Williams, Shabaam Sahdeeq, Talib Kweli, Tash, The Last Emperor, Thirstin Howl III, Wordsworth and Zack de la Rocha among others.

The album peaked at number 167 on the Billboard 200 and number 52 on the Top R&B Albums in the United States. It was preceded by two singles: "Body Rock" and "C.I.A. (Criminals In Action)". "Body Rock" peaked at #15 on the Bubbling Under Hot 100, #65 on the Hot R&B/Hip-Hop Songs, #29 on the Hot Rap Songs and #11 on the Dance Singles Sales. "C.I.A. (Criminals In Action)" peaked at #33 on the Hot Rap Songs.

Track listing

Notes
Track 11 features additional vocals by Kimberly Diamonds
Track 12 features additional vocals by Shawn J Period
Track 17 features additional vocals by Ka
Track 24 features scratches by DJ Spinbad and DJ Daze
Track 25 features additional vocals by Nicole Willis

Sample credits
Track 3 contains a sample of "One Day" written by Jeru the Damaja and DJ Premier
Track 24 contains excerpts from "La Murga Pana Mena" written by Perez and Willie Colón as performed by Cal Tjader
Track 25 contains an interpolation of "Our Ages Our Hearts"

Charts

Singles chart positions

References

External links

1998 albums
Lyricist Lounge
1998 compilation albums
Albums produced by El-P
Albums produced by Nottz
Albums produced by Hi-Tek
Albums produced by 88-Keys
Hip hop compilation albums
Albums produced by DJ Scratch
Record label compilation albums
Rawkus Records compilation albums